Anand Kumar is a retired professor of sociology at Jawaharlal Nehru University, an ex-member of the Aam Aadmi Party, he contested for Lok Sabha (India's lower house of parliament) from the North East Delhi parliamentary constituency in the 2014 Indian general election but lost to BJP candidate Manoj Tiwari.

Academic career
Kumar received an MA in Sociology at the Banaras Hindu University (BHU), Varanasi, 1972; an MPhil. in Sociology at the Jawaharlal Nehru University (JNU), New Delhi, 1975; and a PhD in Sociologists  at the University of Chicago, 1986. He was a lecturer in Sociology at BHU from 1979 to 1989, an Associate Professor of Sociology at JNU from 1990 to 1998, and has been a Professor of Sociology at JNU since 1998. Also taught as India Chair in Germany (Albert Ludwig University, Freiburg), GSP Scholar at Humboldt University (Berlin, Germany), and was Fulbright Visiting Scholar at Tufts University from January to May 2013. International Faculty at Innsbruck University (Austria), GSP faculty at FLACSO (Buenos Aires, Argentina), Visiting professor at NEHU (Shillong) and Kashmir University (Srinagar).

Political career 
Kumar was a National Executive Committee member of the Aam Aadmi Party (AAP). He contested on AAP ticket the Indian Lok Sabha elections of 2014 from the North East Delhi parliamentary constituency and came 2nd. Later on he was expelled from AAP for "Anti-Party activities" than finally along with Yogendra Yadav, Prashant Bhushan, Ajit Jha formed a new political organization called Swaraj Abhiyan and currently is a National convenor of Swaraj Abhiyan.

Bibliography

References 

Academic staff of Jawaharlal Nehru University
Living people
Aam Aadmi Party candidates in the 2014 Indian general election
21st-century Indian politicians
Delhi politicians
1950 births